Akhavan is a surname. Notable people with the surname include:

Desiree Akhavan, American film director and actress
Kazem Akhavan, Iranian diplomat kidnapped in Lebanon in 1982
Mehdi Akhavan-Sales (1928–1990), Iranian poet
Navíd Akhavan (born 1980), Iranian-German actor
Payam Akhavan, Canadian lawyer